Nikiforovka is a rural locality in Naumovsky Selsoviet Rural Settlement, Konyshyovsky District, Kursk Oblast, Russia. Population:

Geography 
The village is located on the Chmacha River (a left tributary of the Svapa River), 52 km from the Russia–Ukraine border, 75 km north-west of Kursk, 14 km north-west of the district center – the urban-type settlement Konyshyovka, 1 km from the selsoviet center – Naumovka.

 Climate
Nikiforovka has a warm-summer humid continental climate (Dfb in the Köppen climate classification).

Transport 
Nikiforovka is located 45 km from the federal route  Ukraine Highway, 49 km from the route  Crimea Highway, 26 km from the route  (Trosna – M3 highway), 12.5 km from the road of regional importance  (Dmitriyev – Beryoza – Menshikovo – Khomutovka), 2 km from the road of intermunicipal significance  (Konyshyovka – Makaro-Petrovskoye, with the access road to the villages of Belyayevo and Chernicheno), on the road  (38N-144 – Oleshenka with the access road to Naumovka), 5 km from the nearest railway halt Grinyovka (railway line Navlya – Lgov-Kiyevsky).

The rural locality is situated 81 km from Kursk Vostochny Airport, 174 km from Belgorod International Airport and 282 km from Voronezh Peter the Great Airport.

References

Notes

Sources

Rural localities in Konyshyovsky District